Hingangaon is a small town and Gram panchayat in Phaltan Tehsil, District Satara of the Indian state of Maharashtra. It is situated in a mountainous region, 6–8 km from the Pune-Pandharpur Highway and Phaltan-Satara Roads mounted on Deccan Plateau.

Government 

The Gram Panchayat governing system is adopted there. The administrator is a democratically elected sarpanch. Grampanchayat has been established here since 2 February 1953.

Legacy 

Hingangaon is one of the capitals of Suryavanshi Bhoite, Royal 96k Maratha Clan who are the Brotherhood of Royal Bhoite's Capital Centres Tadawale Sammat Wagholi and Wagholi. These Bhoite's are mostly related to Maratha Cheiften Family of Bhoite Royal 96k clan. Bhoite families in Hingangaon are prominent Marathas who dominated the political scene of the Phaltan Tehsil and the British colonial period. They were the active leaders of Sansthani Praja Parishada, Phaltan —Princely State under British dominion ruler Maratha Naik Nimbalkar Clan.

This place and the surrounding area was a vassal estate of Satara Kingdom, ruled by Shrimant Abasaheb Bhoite Sarkar. With annexation of Satara Kingdom, this estate lost its position and the ruler refused to submit to British rule.

Culture

This village is known for festivals such as Jatra celebrated on Amavasya of Chaitra. This Jatra continues for twoi days. It starts with a bullock cart race. Chhabina (i.e. Palkhi of Lord Bahirvnath ) starts at midnight and continues until morning with dance and lezim. The main attraction is Bhillache Soang (gate of the jungle king).

Political importance 

Hingangaon is the dominant political region in Phaltan Tehsil.

Education 

Hingangaon hosts no major educational facilities. The facilities available extend to SSC. Some persons receive computer training. The villagers must go to Phaltan, Lonand for education.

Economy 

The major occupation is agriculture. Many villagers work in other occupational fields. Maratha families used to dominate the political scene, military, governments high rank statuses, various industries. Newer crops include grapes and sugar cane. In 2011 it connected with Balkawadi canal, allowing irrigated crops.

Transport 

Transport is mainly by bus. The two main centres are Phaltan and Lonand. Taxis and trucks are available. Locals use bicycles, two-wheelers, and four-wheelers. The nearest useable airport is in Pune, 91 km away. The nearest railway station is Lonand about 15 km away. The roads are poor.

See also 

Bhoite
Maratha
GADHI
Satara District          
Damaji Thorat

References

Sources 
1.Bharat Nirman Programme (Data Updated as on 01/04/05)
Department of Drinking Water Supply, Ministry of Rural Development Govt. of India
http://ddws.nic.in/bnp_hab/school_detail.asp?scode=18&dcode=1811&bcode=1811005&pcode=007&vcode=01&hcode1=01&schcode=1

2.Total Sanitation Campaign (TSC)

Department of Drinking Water Supply, Ministry of Rural Development Govt. of India
http://ddws.gov.in/TSC/crsp/epanchayat/rep_panchwise_entrystatus.asp?stcode=%2013&dtcode=%201324&blcode=4567&id=%202&status=%20003&fromdate=%2001-04-1999&todate=%2002-01-2009

3.Posts and Telegraph In Satara District.
http://www.maharashtra.gov.in/english/gazetteer/SATARA/comm_post%20and%20Telegraph.html

4.Bhoite's In Sansthani Praja Parishad,Phaltan
Freedom Movement in Princely States of Maharashtra
By Arun Bhosale, Ashok S. Chousalkar, Lakshminarayana Tarodi, Shivaji University
Published by Shivaji University, 2001
Original from the University of Michigan
Digitized 3 Sep 2008
238 pages

5.Phaltan Tehsils Villages List :
http://www.pmgsyonline.nic.in/aspnet/Citizens/DG/05DVC/CensusStatus.aspx?state=MH&district=27&block=4&reportLevel=3

6.'''Bhoite Clan Information'

Cities and towns in Satara district
Keshavrao Ramchandra Thorat